The Coccotremataceae are a family of lichen-forming fungi in the order Pertusariales. Species in this widely distributed family grow on bark or rocks, especially in maritime regions.

Genera
, Species Fungorum accepts 3 genera and 23 species, in the family Coccotremataceae. This is a list of the genera in the Coccotremataceae based on a 2020 review and summary of fungal classification by Wijayawardene and colleagues. Following the genus name is the taxonomic authority (those who first circumscribed the genus; standardized author abbreviations are used), year of publication, and the number of species:
Coccotrema  – 16 spp.
Gyalectaria  – 3 spp.
Parasiphula  – 7 spp.

References

Pertusariales
Lichen families
Lecanoromycetes families
Taxa described in 1991
Taxa named by David Leslie Hawksworth